Ambroise-Polycarpe, Vicomte de La Rochefoucauld GE (2 April 1765 – 2 June 1841), first Duke of Doudeauville, was a French soldier and politician. He was Minister of the Royal Household from 1821 to 1827.

Early years

Ambroise-Polycarpe de La Rochefoucauld was born in Paris on 2 April 1765.
He was the grandson of Alexandre-Nicolas de La Rochefoucauld (1709-1760), Marquis de Surgères, who was cited by Voltaire in his Éloges.
His parents were Viscount Jean-François de La Rochefoucauld (1735-1789), Brigadier, and Anne-Sabine-Rosalie de Chauvelin, daughter of Germain Louis de Chauvelin (1685-1762), Marquis de Grosbois, Keeper of the Seals of France.

At the age of fourteen La Rochefoucauld married a descendant of François-Michel le Tellier, Marquis de Louvois, Mademoiselle de Montmirail.
Two years later he joined the dragoons as a second lieutenant, and served in the king's army until 1792.
He rose to the position of deputy-major of cavalry.
During the French Revolution he emigrated, and made a series of tours of different countries of Europe,
He returned to France under the Consulate, but stayed out of politics.
Despite offers from Napoleon, he would only accept the position of a member of the General Council of the Marne.

Bourbon Restoration

After the first Bourbon Restoration, on 4 June 1814 La Rochefoucauld was appointed to the Chamber of Peers.
He sat among the most ardent royalists. He voted for death in the trial of Marshal Ney. 
He fought against freedom of the press, which he viewed as a source of ruin for the country.
On 26 September 1822 he was appointed director general of the posts.
He gained a reputation as a skilled administrator, and introduced several visible improvements in the service.

On 4 August 1824 King Charles X appointed La Rochefoucauld Minister of the Royal Household in place of Marshal Jacques Lauriston.
One of his main acts while in office was to acquire the lands of Grignon for the royal domain and to establish there the Royal Agronomic Institute of Grignon.
In 1828 he fought against the dismissal of the National Guard. 
He resigned as minister on 4 January 1828 and from then on devoted himself to managing charitable institutions.

July Monarchy

La Rochefoucauld was greatly attached to the elder branch of the Bourbons, and did not approve of the July Revolution of 1830.
He spoke in the Chamber of Peers against proposals to perpetually banish the former royal family.
On 9 January 1831 he resigned from the Chamber and his name was removed from the list of peers of France.
He died at the Château de Montmirail, Montmirail, Marne, on 2 June 1841, aged 76.

References
Citations

Sources

1765 births
1841 deaths
Military personnel from Paris
Government ministers of France
Members of the Chamber of Peers of the Bourbon Restoration
Nobility from Paris